Neomycin C transaminase (neoN (gene)) is an enzyme with systematic name 2-oxoglutarate:neomycin C aminotransferase. This enzyme catalyses the following chemical reaction

 neomycin C + 2-oxoglutarate  6'''-deamino-6'''-oxoneomycin C + L-glutamate

The reaction occurs in vivo in the opposite direction.

References

External links 
 

EC 2.6.1